L'année des méduses (The Year of the Jellyfish) is a 1984 French drama film inspired by a novel by Christopher Frank, directed by Frank himself with Valérie Kaprisky and Bernard Giraudeau. The film had a total of 1,554,641 admissions in France where it was the 23rd highest-grossing film of the year.

Plot 
The teenage Chris is on holiday at Saint-Tropez with her mother Claude, while her father remains at work in Paris. After seducing a married friend of her parents and undergoing an abortion, she is looking forward to new sexual adventures. Initially she falls for the older Romain, whose interest is in supplying young girls to rich men. For himself, Romain is far more interested in the mother Claude, who gradually thaws to his approaches and becomes his enthusiastic lover. Put out at this, Chris befriends a German married couple but, after a threesome in their hotel room, the husband leaves in disgust. While starting a romance with the abandoned wife (Barbara), Chris murders Romain in order to thwart her mother.

Principal cast
 Bernard Giraudeau: Romain Kalides, the pimp
 Valérie Kaprisky: Chris, the daughter
 Caroline Cellier: Claude, the mother
 Jacques Perrin: Vic, former lover of Chris
 Béatrice Agenin: Marianne Lamotte
 Barbara Nielsen: Barbara, current lover of Chris

Awards and nominations 
 César Awards (France)
 Won: Best Actress – Supporting Role (Caroline Cellier)

References

External links 
 
 

1984 films
French psychological drama films
1980s psychological drama films
Films based on French novels
Films set in Saint-Tropez
Films shot in Saint-Tropez
Films set in the Mediterranean Sea
Adultery in films
Abortion in fiction
1984 drama films
1980s French-language films
1980s French films